The Directorate of Plant Protection, Quarantine, and Storage is an agency of the Plant Protection Division of the Department of Agriculture, Co-operation and Farmers Welfare, in the Ministry of Agriculture & Farmers' Welfare of the Government of India.

References

External links
 Directorate of Plant Protection, Quarantine, & Storage

Phytosanitary authorities
Ministry of Agriculture & Farmers' Welfare